This is a list of the Romania national under-21 football team results from 2000 to present:

2000

2001

2002

2003

2004

2005

2006

2007

2008

2009

2010

2011

2012

2013

2014

2015

2016

2017

2018

2019

2020

References

External links
Romanian Football Federation
Romania U-21 FRF.ro
Romania U-21 at Soccerway
Romania U-21 news at romaniansoccer.ro

results